Todor Manov (born 17 June 1969) is a Bulgarian wrestler. He competed in the men's Greco-Roman 100 kg at the 1996 Summer Olympics.

References

External links
 

1969 births
Living people
Bulgarian male sport wrestlers
Olympic wrestlers of Bulgaria
Wrestlers at the 1996 Summer Olympics
People from Samokov
Sportspeople from Sofia Province